Syzygium alliiligneum, commonly known as onionwood, Mission Beach satinash or bark in the wood is a species of plant in the family Myrtaceae. It is endemic to a small part of north eastern Queensland.

Description 
The trunk may be fluted and may have buttresses, and the exposed bark is papery and usually pale grey, while newly-exposed bark is pale pink or orange.

The foliage is glossy, dark green above and lighter green below. They are broadly elliptic to obovate with an acuminate tip.

The fruits are more or less globular red to pink berries measuring up to  containing a single large seed. They ripen from May to October.

Taxonomy
This species was first formally described by Bernard "Bernie" Hyland and published in the Australian Journal of Botany in 1983. The holotype was collected by Hyland in 1972 beside the Palmerston Highway west of Innisfail.

Etymology
The genus name Syzygium comes from the Greek word syzgos, meaning "jointed" and is a reference to the paired leaves displayed by members of the genus. The species epithet alliiligneum is derived from the Latin allium, for "garlic", and lignum, for "wood". Cross-sections of the trunk shows onion-like rings of bark in the wood.

Distribution and Habitat 
Syzygium alliiligneum is endemic to coastal rainforested areas of north east Queensland, from Cape Tribulation in the north to Tully in the south.

Ecology 
The fruits of onionwood are eaten by cassowaries, who are probably the only dispersal agent for the species. They are also edible by humans, although sour.

Conservation
This species is listed by the Queensland Department of Environment and Science as least concern. , it has not been assessed by the IUCN.

Cultivation
About 60 trees of this species have been planted as street trees in various parts of Cairns.

Gallery

References

External links
 
 
 View a map of historical sightings of this species at the Australasian Virtual Herbarium
 View observations of this species on iNaturalist
 View images of this species on Flickriver

alliiligneum
Endemic flora of Queensland
Taxa named by Bernard Hyland
Taxa described in 1983
Myrtales of Australia
Trees of Australia
Australian cuisine